The Ubaid house is a dwelling used by the Ubaid culture of the Neolithic era. It is the predecessor of the Ubaid temple as well as Sumerian domestic and temple architecture. This house type has for example been excavated at Tell Rashid in Iraq.

References 

Neolithic
Ancient Mesopotamia
House types
Archaeology of Iraq
Ubaid period